Brian Lee Losey (born November 11, 1960) is a retired rear admiral of the United States Navy. He headed the Naval Special Warfare Command from 2013 until his retirement in 2016. Losey is a native of Tacoma, Washington.

Education
A graduate of the United States Air Force Academy, class of 1983, Losey also holds a Master's degree in National Security Strategy from the National War College, which he received in 2004. He is a graduate of the Defense Language Institute, the Armed Forces Staff College, and Air Command and Staff College.

Career
He attended Basic Underwater Demolition/SEAL (BUD/S) training in Coronado, Calif., and graduated from BUD/S Class 126 in January 1984 and was assigned to SEAL Delivery Vehicle Team ONE.
His operational assignments have included a full range of duties in SEAL Teams, SEAL Delivery Vehicle (SDV) Teams and Special Boat Teams, and deployments to named and contingency operations around the world. Losey served with Special Boat Unit 26 from 1990 to 1992 before receiving an assignment to Naval Special Warfare Development Group (DEVGRU) and completing a specialized selection and training course known as green team in 1993. At DEVGRU he had served as an operations officer, squadron operations officer, and troop commander at the command until 2001. He then commanded SEAL Delivery Vehicle Team One from 2001 to 2003 and served as deputy commander, then unit commander of DEVGRU from 2005 to 2007.

Other assignments include: duty as deputy commander, Naval Special Warfare Task Group, U.S. 6th Fleet; Maritime Operations officer and deputy chief of Current Operations in the Joint Special Operations Command; and U.S. 7th Fleet Special Warfare officer in USS Blue Ridge (LCC 19). He served in the Executive Office of the President as a director on the National Security Council Staff bridging two administrations. On December 14, 2011, the U.S. Senate confirmed Losey's appointment as rear admiral (lower half).

Losey assumed command of Naval Special Warfare Command in Coronado, CA in June 2013. Previously he was Commander, Special Operations Command Africa and Commander, Combined Joint Task Force – Horn of Africa (CJTF-HoA), Camp Lemonnier, Djibouti.
 On March 21, 2016, the Navy announced that Losey was being denied promotion to rear admiral (upper half) following the Inspector General's review of allegations of retaliation taken against subordinates (see detail below). The U.S. Senate blocked Losey's promotion based on these retaliation claims that were confirmed by the Pentagon's Inspector General. The Navy had sought to disregard those findings by promoting Losey before the Senate intervened, effectively ending Losey's career.

Based on the recommendations provided by the Board for Correction of Naval Records, then Secretary of the Navy, Ray Mabus, approved the retroactive promotion of Losey to January 12, 2017. The retroactive date was set to Losey's eligibility date to two-star rear admiral. Along with his promotion to second star, Rear Admiral Losey received back pay and an increase to his annual military retirement pension. The accelerated review in 7 weeks and final week memo by Navy Secretary Ray Mabus granting the promotion were widely criticized by members of Congress and Naval law observers. Losey is an Advisory Board Member of Spirit of America, a 501(c)(3) organization that supports the safety and success of Americans serving abroad and the local people and partners they seek to help.

Retaliation complaints
In 2011–2015, the Department of Defense Inspector General (DOD IG) investigated and upheld three out of five whistle-blower retaliation complaints against Admiral Losey after questioning 100 witnesses and amassing 300,000 pages of records.

According to The Washington Post, Losey "was investigated five times by the Defense Department’s inspector general after subordinates complained that he had wrongly fired, demoted or punished them during a vengeful but fruitless hunt for the person who had anonymously reported him for a minor travel-policy infraction."

The DOD IG found that Admiral Losey wrongly believed there was "a conspiracy to undermine his command". Inspector General recommended that the Navy discipline Losey for violating whistleblower-protection laws. Navy leadership reviewed the DOD Inspector General report and concluded that "none of the allegations rose to the level of misconduct on Admiral Losey’s part."

In a statement to the Congressional Record in December 2015, Senator Ron Wyden (D-Ore) said he had placed a hold on the nomination of Janine Davidson, a former Pentagon official and Air Force pilot, to become the next Navy undersecretary until the service reconsidered its decision not to punish Admiral Losey for his violations of the Whistleblower Protection Act of 1989. In April, 2016 the Navy decided to not promote Losey, paving the way for Davidson's appointment.

Substantive support 
William H. McRaven called him “without a doubt one of the finest officers with whom I have ever served. Over the past 15 years no officer I know in the SEAL Teams has given more to this country than Brian.” He described it as an example of a “disturbing trend in how politicians abuse and denigrate military leadership, particularly the officer corps, to advance their political agendas.”

On the House floor, Retired SEAL officer-turned-Republican Congressman Ryan Zinke (R-MT), rejected claims that Losey retaliated. “He saw a problem and took action”. “Once again, an entrusted, entrenched bureaucracy was allowed to hide behind threats, hide behind whistleblowers, hide behind rules that were intended to protect command and not to erode it.”

Awards and decorations
Brian L. Losey received multiple awards and recognitions:

References

External links

 Rear Admiral Brian L. Losey Commander, Naval Special Warfare Command, United States Navy Biography

1960 births
Living people
People from Tacoma, Washington
United States Air Force Academy alumni
American military personnel of Japanese descent
United States Navy SEALs personnel
National War College alumni
Recipients of the Navy Distinguished Service Medal
Recipients of the Defense Superior Service Medal
United States Navy admirals